Tetradoxa is a monotypic genus in the family Adoxaceae containing the single species Tetradoxa omeiensis. It is sometimes included in the genus Adoxa. It is endemic to China, where it is known only from Sichuan.

This species has a stem 10 to 20 centimeters long with a few basal leaves and one pair of oppositely arranged stem leaves. It produces an inflorescence of 3 to 5 yellow-green flowers.

References

Endemic flora of China
Adoxaceae
Endangered plants
Monotypic asterid genera
Dipsacales genera
Taxonomy articles created by Polbot